Geshna is a monotypic moth genus of the family Crambidae described by Harrison Gray Dyar Jr. in 1906. It contains only one species, Geshna cannalis, the lesser canna leafroller, described by Altus Lacy Quaintance in 1898. It is found in North America, where it has been recorded from Florida, Mississippi, South Carolina, North Carolina and Tennessee. It has also been recorded from Costa Rica and Cuba.

The wingspan is 20–25 mm. Adults are light brown with two brownish-black lines across the forewings and hindwings, as well as a small angular white patch near the distal portion of the discal cell on the forewings. Adults are on wing from February to May, from July to August and from November to December.

The larvae feed on Canna species. Young larvae mine the leaves of their host plant, creating a mine between the upper and lower epidermis. The mine is filled with frass. Young larvae reach a length of about 1.4 mm. They have a yellowish, somewhat transparent body and a yellow head. Older larvae feed gregariously on the upper leaf surface and later roll a leaf of their host plant. Up to six larvae may live within a single leaf roll. Last instar larvae reach a length of about 23 mm. They are yellowish white with a yellow head. Pupation takes place in a silken shelter within the leaf roll.

References

Spilomelinae
Monotypic moth genera
Taxa named by Harrison Gray Dyar Jr.
Moths of North America
Crambidae genera